Frederick Walter Lasher (August 19, 1941 – February 27, 2022) was an American Major League Baseball pitcher who played six seasons with the Minnesota Twins (1963), Detroit Tigers (1967–1970), Cleveland Indians (1970), and California Angels (1971).

Over six major league seasons, he appeared in 151 games (all but one as a relief pitcher) and had a won–lost record of 11–13 with 22 saves and a 3.88 earned run average; in 202 innings pitched, he permitted 179 hits and 110 bases on balls; he struck out 148.

In , Lasher appeared in 34 games for the pennant-winning and world champion Tigers, finishing with a 5–1 record and a 3.33 earned run average. He also pitched two scoreless innings in the 1968 World Series to help the Tigers beat the St. Louis Cardinals, four games to three. In , Lasher appeared in a career-high 55 games for the Tigers and Indians.

In his only MLB starting pitcher assignment, on July 12, 1970, at Cleveland Stadium against the Boston Red Sox, Lasher recorded two outs in the first inning before permitting a single to Carl Yastrzemski. Lasher then threw a pitch that hit the next Boston batter, Tony Conigliaro, on his left forearm. An enraged Conigliaro charged Lasher on the mound, and, in the ensuing melee, he kicked Lasher in the hip (inflicting a spike wound), and punched him in the nose. Conigliaro was ejected from the game, but Lasher was allowed to continue on the mound. In the second inning, however, he surrendered back-to-back home runs to Conigliaro's brother and teammate, Billy, and Boston catcher Tom Satriano, and was removed from the game for a relief pitcher. Lasher then required a tetanus shot from a local hospital because of the spike wound he suffered in the first-inning brawl. Lasher was also charged with the 8–2 loss.

Lasher died on February 27, 2022, at the age of 80.

References

External links

 Baseball Almanac

1941 births
2022 deaths
Atlanta Crackers players
Baseball players from New York (state)
Bismarck-Mandan Pards players
California Angels players
Charlotte Hornets (baseball) players
Cleveland Indians players
Detroit Tigers players
Fort Walton Beach Jets players
Major League Baseball pitchers
Minnesota Twins players
Montgomery Rebels players
Salt Lake City Angels players
Sportspeople from Poughkeepsie, New York
Toledo Mud Hens players
Wilson Tobs players
Wytheville Senators players